Craig Watson (12 January 1942 – 7 November 2001) was a Scottish footballer who played as a winger for Rangers.

Career
Watson was a member of the youngest Rangers forward line in the history of the club when he lined up alongside Willie Henderson, Alex Willoughby, Jim Forrest, and George McLean against Real Madrid in a European Cup match in the Bernabéu Stadium in 1963.

Watson's proudest achievement was playing in the 1963 Scottish League Cup Final when Rangers defeated Morton 5–0. He later transferred to Cappielow, spending several seasons playing under Hal Stewart.

Watson, who also had spells with Kilmarnock and Falkirk, eventually emigrated to South Africa, where he ended his playing career.

References

External links

1942 births
2001 deaths
Scottish footballers
Footballers from Glasgow
Rangers F.C. players
Greenock Morton F.C. players
Kilmarnock F.C. players
Falkirk F.C. players
Arcadia Shepherds F.C. players
Highlands Park F.C. players
Scottish Football League players
Association football wingers
Scottish expatriate footballers
Expatriate soccer players in South Africa
Scottish expatriate sportspeople in South Africa
Arthurlie F.C. players
Scottish Junior Football Association players